Chittagong-11 is a constituency represented in the Jatiya Sangsad (National Parliament) of Bangladesh since 2014 by M. Abdul Latif of the Awami League.

Boundaries 
The constituency encompasses Chittagong City Corporation wards 27 through 30 and 36 through 41.

History 
The constituency was created for the first general elections in newly independent Bangladesh, held in 1973.

Ahead of the 2008 general election, the Election Commission redrew constituency boundaries to reflect population changes revealed by the 2001 Bangladesh census. The 2008 redistricting altered the boundaries of the constituency.

Ahead of the 2014 general election, the Election Commission renumbered the seat for Sandwip Upazila from Chittagong-16 to Chittagong-3, bumping up by one the suffix of the former constituency of that name and the higher numbered constituencies in the district. Thus Chittagong-11 covers the area previously covered by Chittagong-10. Previously Chittagong-11 encompassed all but five union parishads of Patiya Upazila: Bara Uthan, Char Lakshya, Char Patharghata, Juldha, and Sikalbaha .

Members of Parliament 
Key

Elections

Elections in the 2010s

Elections in the 2000s

Elections in the 1990s

References

External links
 

Parliamentary constituencies in Bangladesh
Chittagong District